The Rokewood Corindhap Football Netball Club is an Australian rules football club from Rokewood, Victoria which competes in the Central Highlands Football League. The Grasshoppers joined the league in 2011 after the Lexton Plains FL disbanded.

History
Established in 1931 during the height of the Great Depression, following the merger of the Rokewood and Corindhap Football Clubs.

The Grasshoppers moved to the Western Plains FL in 1935 to join their nearest neighbour, Illabarook. The club had to wait until after WW2 to win its first flag. The club won nine flags including a hat-trick from 1992 to 1994. The Western Plains Football League merged with the Lexton Football League in 1999, forming the Lexton Plains Football League. 

The Grasshoppers previously competed in the Lexton Plains Football League, but the league folded at the end of the 2010 season.

Leagues and Premierships
 Linton Carngham District Football Association (1931-1934)
 Nil
 Western Plains Football League (1935-1998)
 1947, 1957, 1963, 1967, 1978, 1979, 1992, 1993, 1994
 Lexton Plains Football League (1999-2010)
 2002
 Central Highlands Football League (2011-present)
 Nil

VFL/AFL players

 Russell Middlemiss -

Bibliography
 History of Football in the Ballarat District by John Stoward -

References

External links
 Gameday website
 Rokewood-Corindhap FNC profile on AFL National

Australian rules football clubs in Victoria (Australia)
Australian rules football clubs established in 1931
Sports clubs established in 1931
1931 establishments in Australia
Netball teams in Victoria (Australia)